A by-election was held for the Australian House of Representatives seat of Bendigo on 16 July 1960. This was triggered by the death of Labor MP Percy Clarey. A by-election for the seat of Balaclava was held on the same day.

The by-election was won by Labor candidate Noel Beaton.

Results

References

1960 elections in Australia
Victorian federal by-elections
1960s in Victoria (Australia)
July 1960 events in Australia